Trupanea neodaphne is a species of tephritid or fruit flies in the genus Trupanea of the family Tephritidae.

Distribution
Paraguay, Uruguay.

References

Tephritinae
Insects described in 1933
Taxa named by John Russell Malloch
Diptera of South America